Mandrell is a surname. Notable people with the surname include:

Barbara Mandrell (born 1948), American country music singer
Irlene Mandrell (born 1956), American musician, actress, and model
Louise Mandrell (born 1954), American country music singer

See also
Mandrel
Mandrill